The Burglar's Dilemma is a 1912 American drama film directed by  D. W. Griffith. A print of the film survives.

Cast
 Lionel Barrymore as The Householder
 Henry B. Walthall as Householder's Weakling Brother
 Adolph Lestina as The Butler
 Gertrude Bambrick as Birthday Wellwisher
 Harry Carey as Older Crook
 John T. Dillon as Interrogating Detective
 Frank Evans as Policeman
 Dorothy Gish as Birthday Wellwisher
 Lillian Gish as Birthday Wellwisher
 Robert Harron as Young Burglar
 Madge Kirby as Birthday Wellwisher
 J. Jiquel Lanoe as Birthday Wellwisher
 Alfred Paget as Interrogating Detective
 W. C. Robinson as Policeman
 Charles West as Beat Cop/Medic

See also
 Harry Carey filmography
 D. W. Griffith filmography
 Lillian Gish filmography
 Lionel Barrymore filmography

References

External links
 
 The Burglar's Dilemma on YouTube
 

1912 films
1912 drama films
1912 short films
Silent American drama films
American silent short films
American black-and-white films
Films directed by D. W. Griffith
Films with screenplays by Lionel Barrymore
1910s American films